Fanchette Flamm is a former table tennis player from Austria.

Table tennis career
She won a gold medal in the women's doubles event at the World Table Tennis Championships in 1928.

Her two World Championship medals included a gold medal in the singles at the 1928 World Table Tennis Championships.

See also
 List of table tennis players
 List of World Table Tennis Championships medalists

References

Austrian female table tennis players
Living people
Year of birth missing (living people)